The 2012 Montana Grizzlies football team represented the University of Montana in the 2012 NCAA Division I FCS football season. The Grizzlies were led by first-year head coach Mick Delaney and played their home games on campus at Washington–Grizzly Stadium. Montana is a charter member of the Big Sky Conference.

Previous head coach Robin Pflugrad was fired in March by university president Royce Engstrom before starting his third season.

The Grizzlies finished the season 5–6, 3–5 in Big Sky play to finish in a three way tie for eighth place.

Schedule

Source: Official Schedule

Game summaries

South Dakota

Appalachian State

First ever regular season meeting. Previous two meetings came in the playoff semifinals in 2000 and 2009.

Liberty

Northern Arizona

Eastern Washington

Northern Colorado

Southern Utah

North Dakota

Idaho State

Weber State

Montana State

Rankings

References

Montana
Montana Grizzlies football seasons
Montana Grizzlies football